Fabienne Suter (born 5 January 1985) is a former World Cup alpine ski racer from Switzerland. Born in Sattel in the canton of Schwyz, she specialized in super-G, giant slalom, and downhill.

Career
At the 2003 World Championships in St. Moritz, she fell in the giant slalom and injured her pelvis. While recovering, Suter resided in Calgary, Canada, with close family friends. This was followed by other injuries. Following appearances in FIS and Europa Cup races, she returned to the World Cup in for the 2007  She won a bronze medal as part of the team at the FIS Alpine World Ski Championships in 2007 with Sandra Gini, Nadia Styger, Rabea Grand, Daniel Albrecht and Marc Berthod.

Her first top ten finish was in February 2008, a seventh place in downhill in St. Moritz. The next week she won her first World Cup race in the super-G in Sestriere, tied with Andrea Fischbacher. At the World Cup finals in Bormio, she won another super-G race on 13 March.

In the 2007 World Championships in Åre, Sweden, Suter came in 11th in the super-G and 13th in the giant slalom, having had to start with a higher number. With the Swiss team she won the bronze medal in the team event, having contributed the second-fastest time in the super-G run.

World Cup results

Season standings

Race podiums
 4 wins – (1 DH, 3 SG)
 20 podiums – (8 DH, 11 SG, 1 SC)

World Championship results

Olympic results

References

External links

 
 Fabienne Suter World Cup standings at the International Ski Federation
 
 

 Dynastar Skis – Fabienne Suter
 Swiss Ski team – official site – 

1985 births
Swiss female alpine skiers
Alpine skiers at the 2010 Winter Olympics
Alpine skiers at the 2014 Winter Olympics
Olympic alpine skiers of Switzerland
Sportspeople from the canton of Schwyz
Living people
21st-century Swiss women